This Is What I Know About Being Gigantic  is the debut release from Minus the Bear.

Track listing

Personnel
Jake Snider - Vocals & Guitar
Dave Knudson - Guitar
Erin Tate - Drums
Cory Murchy - Bass
Matt Bayles - Electronics

Production
Recorded by Matt Bayles and Minus The Bear
Mixed by Matt Bayles
Assisted by Troy Tiejten and Tom Harpel
Mastered by Ed Brooks

References

External links
SuicideSqueeze.net

Suicide Squeeze Records albums
2001 debut EPs
Minus the Bear albums